Courage the Cowardly Dog is an American animated television series created and directed by John R. Dilworth. The pilot episode, "The Chicken from Outer Space", originally aired as part of What a Cartoon! on February 18, 1996. The series officially premiered on Cartoon Network on November 12, 1999, and ended on November 22, 2002, with a total of 52 episodes over the course of four seasons. A CGI special titled "The Fog of Courage" was broadcast on Cartoon Network in Southeast Asia on October 31, 2014. The series is about an anthropomorphic dog named Courage, who lives with an elderly couple in Nowhere, Kansas. In each episode, the trio are thrown into bizarre and frequently disturbing misadventures, often involving the paranormal or supernatural.

The 2021 direct-to-DVD film Straight Outta Nowhere: Scooby-Doo! Meets Courage the Cowardly Dog is the only official Courage project in which Dilworth has no involvement.

Series overview

Episodes

Pilot (1996)

Season 1 (1999–2000)

Season 2 (2000–2001)

Season 3 (2001–2002)

Season 4 (2002)

Special (2014) 
In 2014, a special CGI animated episode was produced as a pilot for a potential CGI revival of the series. It was aired on Cartoon Network in Southeast Asia for Halloween 2014, but it has yet to air elsewhere.

Crossover film (2021)
In 2021, a straight-to-video movie crossing over with Scooby-Doo was released, titled Straight Outta Nowhere: Scooby-Doo! Meets Courage the Cowardly Dog. The film was produced by Warner Bros. Animation and Cartoon Network Studios, but without involvement of Courage creator John R. Dilworth. The movie was released to DVD and digital on September 14, 2021.

Notes

References

External links 
 

Lists of American children's animated television series episodes
Lists of Cartoon Network television series episodes
Episodes